Maria Elisabetta Sancassani (born 6 February 1983) is an Italian female competition rower. A gold medal winner at the 2005 Mediterranean Games she twice represented her native country at the Summer Olympics, in 2004 and 2008. She began competing as a lightweight in 2012 and won the women's lightweight double scull in 2013 with Laura Milani, both at the European Rowing Championships and the World Rowing Championships.

She is the younger sister of nine-time world champion rower Franco Sancassani.

References

1983 births
Living people
Italian female rowers
Olympic rowers of Italy
Rowers at the 2004 Summer Olympics
Rowers at the 2008 Summer Olympics
Sportspeople from Lecco
World Rowing Championships medalists for Italy
Mediterranean Games gold medalists for Italy
Competitors at the 2005 Mediterranean Games
Mediterranean Games medalists in rowing
European Rowing Championships medalists